First Republic Bank is a commercial bank and provider of wealth management services headquartered in San Francisco. It caters to high-net-worth individuals. It operates 93 offices in 11 states primarily in New York, California, Massachusetts, and Florida. As of December 31, 2022, the company had $166 billion in outstanding loans receivable, including $102 billion in loans secured by residential real estate, $34 billion in loans secured by income-producing commercial real estate, $18 billion in business loans, and $10 billion in other loans. Collateral securing loans was overwhelmingly in the metro areas of Boston, New York City, San Francisco, and Los Angeles.

History

Foundation as an ILC, bank charter, and IPO 
First Republic was founded in February 1985 by Jim Herbert, previously the founder and CEO of San Francisco Bancorp, which he sold to Atlantic Financial. First Republic began operations on July 1, 1985, as a California-chartered industrial loan company. It became a public company via an initial public offering on the NASDAQ in August 1986, selling stock at $10 a share. In 1993, First Republic acquired Silver State Thrift, a savings and loan association in Nevada.

In 1996, First Republic sought to shift to a banking charter to expand its offerings. It lobbied the Nevada Legislature to pass a law allowing conversion of a Nevada thrift into a Nevada state bank. The law passed in July 1997, shortly after First Republic completed a reverse merger of the larger California-chartered thrift into the Nevada-chartered Silver State Thrift subsidiary. After the passage of the law, the Nevada thrift became a state-chartered bank, First Republic Savings Bank.

Acquisitions 
In 1998, First Republic acquired Trainer Worthman & Co., and in December 2001, it acquired Starbuck, Tisdale & Associates for $13 million in cash and stock. In January 2000, First Republic acquired an 18% interest in Froley, Levy Investment Company Inc., and in 2002, it purchased the investment firm for $17 million in cash and stock.

In 2004, it acquired the Private Client Asset Management division of Bay Isle Financial from Janus Capital Group.

In 2006, the bank acquired Bank of Walnut Creek.

Acquisition by Merrill Lynch, sale, and second IPO 
In September 2007, First Republic was acquired by Merrill Lynch for $1.8 billion in cash and stock.

In July 2010, Bank of America, which acquired Merrill Lynch and thereby acquired First Republic, sold First Republic Bank to a group of private investors including Colony Capital, General Atlantic, and  chairman James Herbert and former COO Katherine August DeWilde, for approximately $1 billion. Thomas J. Barrack, Jr., the head of Colony, had been a board member prior to the Merrill Lynch deal and General Atlantic had been an early investor in the firm putting up about $5 million in 1987. An additional $800 million was provided by the  investment consortium to meet new capital requirements established by U.S. regulators.

In December 2010, the bank once again became a public company via an initial public offering, raising $280.5 million.

Later acquisitions 
In November 2012, First Republic acquired Luminous Capital, a wealth management firm with $5.5 billion in assets, for $125 million.

In 2015, First Republic acquired Constellation Wealth Partners for $115 million.

In December 2016, the bank acquired Gradifi, a then 2-year old startup that works with companies to help employees pay off student loan debt that counted PricewaterhouseCoopers, Natixis Global Asset Management, and Penguin Random House as customers.

In March 2018, the bank invested in CommonBond, a student loan financier. 

In May 2018, the company leased more office space at Rockefeller Center in New York City.

In 2019, 50 client advisors, who were part of First Republic's Luminous acquisition, with $17 billion of assets under management, left the company.

2023 liquidity problems and rescue effort by competitors 

During the March 2023 United States bank failures, Fitch Ratings and S&P Global Ratings downgraded First Republic's credit rating, citing "a high proportion of uninsured deposits" from wealthy customers who are more likely to move their money elsewhere and a loan-to-deposit ratio of 111%, meaning that it has lent out more money than it has in deposits from customers. To alleviate concerns of a possible bank run and support any withdrawals of deposits, on March 16, 2023, eleven American banks including JPMorgan Chase, Bank of America, Wells Fargo, Citigroup, and Truist Financial deposited $30 billion with First Republic. Despite the deposits, shares of the company continued to decline on March 17. On March 19, the bank's capital shortfall was $13.5 billion, which The Wall Street Journal compared to the liquidity crisis of the Silicon Valley Bank being a factor in its collapse.

Financials

Note: The financial data for the total revenue, net income, assets, and dividends per common share is sourced from the company's annual reports, earnings releases, and SEC Form 10-Ks from 2009 to 2021. Total revenue:  Net Income:  Assets:  Market cap:  Average Stock Price:  Dividends per common share:

References

External links

 

1985 establishments in California
1980s initial public offerings
2007 mergers and acquisitions
2010 initial public offerings
American companies established in 1985
Banks based in California
Banks established in 1985
Companies based in San Francisco
Companies listed on the New York Stock Exchange
Financial services companies established in 1985